Trosley Country Park is in Trottiscliffe, near Vigo, in Kent, England. Once part of a large woodland estate then after many changes, it was passed to Kent County Council, who turned it into a large country park.

History

The country park was once part of the Trosley Towers Estate.

The manor house in the estate was later demolished.

The  park was opened in 1976 by Kent County Council.

In 2004, an amenity block (with a public toilet facility, offices and store area) was built within the park. It had a sweet chestnut (Castanea sativa) timber cladding from the local trees in the park. Also built with a sedum roof and rainwater drainage system recycled into the toilet flushing systems. The building also won the Public Building category of the 2005 Kent Design Awards.

Ecology
It is situated on the North Downs and the chalk grassland slopes of the park are a Site of Special Scientific Interest. These slopes were formerly used as grazing for farm animals, but were left to naturalise after the farms moved to the lower and more productive wealdland pastures. After the park was formed, these grasslands were cleared of scrub to allow the rare chalk land plants and animals to re-establish including the musk orchid, and chalkhill blue butterfly. Other meadow insects found include the dark green fritillary.

Recreation

The park has various circular trails around the site, within Downs Wood, Great Wood and Butchers Wood. Three main trails are marked. It also passes Little Pell (wood) Great Pell Field (meadow).

The North Downs Way leads via a bridleway through the Country Park on its way from Wrotham to Upper Halling.

An 'Adventurous Pub Walk' of  starts in the park and leads to Ryarsh and Addington, before returning to the park.
The Coldrum Trail also starts in the country park and leads to the Coldrum Stones, before returning to the park.

Location
Situated off Junction 2 of the M20 motorway, the park is located off the A227 between Meopham and Wrotham.

References

External links
Kent County Page
Kent Downs page

Country parks in Kent
Parks and open spaces in Kent